The Captives is a 2004 American film starring Elliot Miller, produced and directed by Jude Miller for Jude True Blue Productions. It is based on the true story of Mary Draper Ingles and her struggles during the French-Indian War. The film tells the story of Mary Draper Ingles and others in her settlement being taken captive to the Ohio Country by  Shawnee Indian Warriors, and her journey home as she escaped from the tribe.

Background

The Seven Years’ War, better known as the French and Indian War, was a conflict between the French, British, and Native Americans over land. English land speculators encouraged people to move west and build farms. Mary Draper Ingles’ family was one of many who were recruited to move west of the mountains. As more English settlers moved west towards their lands and hunting grounds; Native American tribes revolted. They invaded English settlements, including that of Mary Draper Ingles.

Plot

The movie begins in the summer of 1755, with a terrible attack on Drapers Meadow by the Shawnee Indian Warriors. Many people were killed in the attack, including Mary Draper Ingles’ mother, and her sister-in-law’s baby whose head was bashed against the side of a house. Mary, her two boys, and her sister-in-law were taken captive by the Shawnee on a long journey west to Ohio Country. Mary tried to remember important landmarks along the way in case they had a chance to escape. She tied knots in her sash each day to keep track of how long they were gone. By the end of the second day of their journey, they reached the point where Indian Creek flows into the New River. The Shawnee had two canoes secreted at the riverbank, which they used to carry captives and stolen food. The Shawnee swam with the horses. That night they camped west of the New River. At this time Will and John, Mary’s husband and brother, were setting out to rescue the captives. Mary was pregnant during the time of the trip so she had to stop and give birth alongside the river. After, they continued their trip over Flat Top Mountain and along Paint Creek.

The next stop they made was at a salt spring at Canal River to make salt. When they reached the Shawnee town which was by the Ohio and Scioto River, the warriors were welcomed home. There was a big celebration that lasted late into the night. The next morning all the captives except Mary were forced to run the gauntlet by the Shawnee. After the gauntlet, things got worse for the captives. Mary’s two boys and her sister in law were taken away. Mary had to give her baby to a caretaker named Sauwaseekau, so that she could work making shirts for the Shawnee. She was an excellent seamstress and was paid well. When Mary asked how much it would cost to get freedom for her children, she was told that she and her children were to become Shawnee.

The Shawnee started sending Mary and an Old Dutch woman out on daily trips to look for berries. Because they were alone, Mary started thinking they could escape. In preparation, they stole a little extra food each day before the trip. Mary left her baby with Sauwaseekau because she knew the baby could not survive the long journey home. Mary and the old Dutch woman set out on the trip, knowing they could not return to the Shawnee or they would be facing death. Mary and the old Dutch woman navigated themselves by the rivers. Neither of them could swim, so they had to go around the rivers making their trip even longer. After a while, hunger took toll on them, and the old Dutch woman tried to eat Mary. Mary escaped from her and found a canoe buried under leaves alongside the river. She used it to cross the river and keep distance between her and the old Dutch woman. They continued on their journey and from time to time saw each other traveling on the other side of the river and encouraged each other to keep going. After 43 days and 800 miles, Mary had arrived home to her husband, brother, and friends.

Theme

We all should face troublesome times with faith, courage, and perseverance.

Genre

Action /Drama /Biography /History

Cast

Jude Miller

Writer, producer, and director of The Captives. Jude became interested with the story of Mary Draper Ingles after the  disaster on September 11th, and began writing the screenplay in 2002. She was deeply inspired by the story of Mary Draper Ingles and her bravery and determination through trying times.

Main characters

 Garlan Miller- Narrator
 Sarah "Sadie" Jones- Storyteller
 Elliot Miller- Mary Draper Ingles
 Hayley Schmidt- Betty Draper
 Katie Gaughan- Draper Infant
 James Blake- Shawnee War Captain
 Kayla Walker- Thomas Ingles
 David Walker- George Ingles
 Andrew Miller- John Draper
 James Zablocki- William Ingles
 Susan Greathouse- Mrs. Stump
 Christian Hays- Chief
 Tony Gerard- Fur Trader
 Maria Hays- Sauwaseekau

Awards and reviews

The Captives is the Winner of 2005 Gold Davey Award, which honors films made by small production companies. It also received the Award of Excellence in the 2005 Accolade Competition, Award of Excellence for Drama in the 2005 DV Awards, and Winner of 2004 West Virginia Filmmaker’s Film Festival for Best Docudrama.

“The South Charleston Museum is sponsoring a showing of "The Captives", the new Mary Ingles film directed by Spencer filmmaker Jude Miller, at 7 p.m.July 31, 2004 at The LaBelle Theater in downtown South Charleston. In June, the film premiered at the Robey Theater where more than 600 people saw it at two screenings. The film stars Miller's daughter, Screen Actors Guild actress Elliot Lowe Miller, in her first film role. Her performance can be compared to Nicole Kidman in "Cold Mountain". The period costumes, especially for the Shawnee warriors, are as good as anything in Hollywood film. The film was an official 'indie SAG' film which is limited to a budget of $75,000. If you love WV history, see this film." Steve Fesenmaier -- Graffiti News

"...sets the standard for skill and artistry."—Accolade Competition

"...the highest standards of creativity and execution."—International Academy of the Visual Arts (IAVA)

Movie locations

Camp Shepard – Roane County, West Virginia
Charles Fork Lake- Spencer, West Virginia
The McIntosh Mansion- Spencer, West Virginia
New River Gorge- Fayetteville, West Virginia
The Pioneer Shop- Ripley, West Virginia
Pricket’s Fork State Park- Fairmont, West Virginia
Spring Heights Education Center- Roane County, West Virginia
West Virginia Museum of Culture and History- Charleston, West Virginia

Music

Original compositions

“Release” written by Elliot Miller, performed by Elliot and Andrew Miller.
“Music for The Captives” written and performed by Scott Schmidt.
“Forever” and “Fields of Alyssum” written and performed by John Sheltmire.

Albums

 Wire Fire by Jake Krack, who specializes in music of the old mountain fiddlers.

Movie facts

It is unknown whether Mary actually gave birth during the journey to Ohio Country. It is believed that it could have happened at this time because of the difference in age between her children.
The clock shown at the beginning of the movie actually belonged to Will and Mary Ingles. It is held at the Museum of Culture and History in Charleston West Virginia.
Mary did say that the old Dutch woman actually tried to eat her.

References

External links
 Mary Ingles Trail Association
 Roane County Library
 West Virginia Film Makers Film Festival
 Music by Jake Krack

2004 films